The siege of Porto is considered the period between July 1832 and August 1833 in which the troops of Dom Pedro remained besieged by the forces of Dom Miguel I of Portugal.

The resistance of the city of Porto and the troops of Dom Pedro made the victory of the liberal cause in the Kingdom of Portugal possible. Those that fought in the Siege of Porto on the Liberal side include Almeida Garrett, Alexandre Herculano and Joaquim António de Aguiar.

Occupation of Porto and first encounters

On 9 July 1832, the Liberal army entered Porto the day after the Landing of Mindelo and found the city abandoned by the Royalist troops, whose leaders, not knowing the exact number of Liberal forces, had decided to withdraw.

General Manuel Gregório de Sousa Pereira de Sampaio, a first degree viscount of Santa Marta and supreme commander of the division that operated between the Royalists Coimbra and Vila do Conde, decided to settle in Vila Nova de Gaia. He ordered that on the same day of the entry of the Liberals forces into the city, an attack should be made against the occupants. On 10 July the Liberal English admiral George Rose Sartorius sent his boats into the mouth of the River Douro and fought back the Royalists' fire. While protected by the Liberal fleet, the division of Lieutenant-Colonel John Schwalbach crossed the river and occupied the Serra do Pilar, in Gaia, forcing the Royalists to withdraw in disorder to Oliveira de Azeméis.

Meanwhile, John Schwalbach advanced with his forces to the Alto da Bandeira and placed an advanced guard at Carvalhos. The two armies remained under mutual observation, without any of them daring to make an advance.

On 18 July, the first attack by the Royalists occurred, without success. Five days later the Battle of Ponte Ferreira was fought, in which a Liberal column routed the Royalists and returned to Porto. The Liberals committed numerous brutalities on their way, reinforcing the bad concept created by the clergy of the villages that the local populations had about the Liberals.

Besieged forces

On the Royalists side, General Álvaro Xavier da Fonseca Coutinho e Póvoas and the Viscount of Santa Marta joined forces. The two generals disposed their armies to surround the city.

Dom Pedro sent a column to attack Valongo, which fell in an ambush by the Royalists along the Ferreira Bridge. This made her go back to Rio Tinto in a defeat that alarmed the city. Meanwhile, the Serra do Pilar was fortified by Major Sá Nogueira. Dom Pedro, who saw the impossibility of occupying the north of the country as originally he had planned, reorganized the army and created the General Staff. He dispatched Pedro de Sousa Holstein, 1st Duke of Palmela, to London, with the mission of obtaining financial support to the cause and contracting officers and soldiers.

On 27 July, a violent battle was fought south of Grijó. Póvoas routed the forces of the Count of Vila Flor, who retreated in disorder to the Alto da Bandeira. Due to the rivalry between Santa Marta and Póvoas, the Royalist troops came to be commanded by General Gaspar Teixeira, Viscount of Peso da Régua. This initiated the siege of the city, which was surrounded by a series of strongholds beginning in the Quinta da China in Campanhã near the River Douro, ending near the Senhora da Luz in the mouth of Douro, near the sea. This whole line located north of the river. To the south the lines began at Cabedelo in Canidelo, on the opposite side of the mouth of Douro, and ended at Pedra Salgada, next to the hill of the Seminar, placing fifteen batteries in this area.

References

1832 in Portugal
1833 in Portugal
History of Porto
Porto
Porto